The 2019 Copa Libertadores final stages were played from 23 July to 23 November 2019. A total of 16 teams competed in the final stages deciding the champions of the 2019 Copa Libertadores, with the final played in Lima, Peru at the Estadio Monumental.

Qualified teams
The winners and runners-up of each of the eight groups in the group stage advanced to the round of 16.

Seeding

Starting from the round of 16, the teams are seeded according to their results in the group stage, with the group winners (Pot 1) seeded 1–8, and the group runners-up (Pot 2) seeded 9–16.

Format

Starting from the round of 16, the teams played a single-elimination tournament with the following rules:
In the round of 16, quarter-finals and semi-finals, each tie was played on a home-and-away two-legged basis, with the higher-seeded team hosting the second leg (Regulations Article 23). If tied on aggregate, the away goals rule was used. If still tied, extra time was not played, and a penalty shoot-out was used to determine the winners (Regulations Article 29).
The final was played as a single match at a venue pre-selected by CONMEBOL, with the higher-seeded team designated as the "home" team for administrative purposes (Regulations Article 26). If tied after regulation, 30 minutes of extra time were played. If still tied after extra time, a penalty shoot-out was used to determine the winners (Regulations Article 30).

Draw

The draw for the round of 16 was held on 13 May 2019, 20:30 PYT (UTC−4), at the CONMEBOL Convention Centre in Luque, Paraguay. For the round of 16, the 16 teams were drawn into eight ties (A–H) between a group winner (Pot 1) and a group runner-up (Pot 2), with the group winners hosting the second leg. Teams from the same association or the same group could be drawn into the same tie.

Bracket
The bracket starting from the round of 16 was determined as follows:

The bracket was decided based on the round of 16 draw, which was held on 13 May 2019.

Round of 16
The first legs were played on 23–25 July, and the second legs were played on 30–31 July and 1 August 2019.

|}

Match A

Tied 0–0 on aggregate, River Plate won on penalties and advanced to the quarter-finals (Match S1).

Match B

Palmeiras won 6–2 on aggregate and advanced to the quarter-finals (Match S2).

Match C

Tied 2–2 on aggregate, Flamengo won on penalties and advanced to the quarter-finals (Match S3).

Match D

LDU Quito won 4–2 on aggregate and advanced to the quarter-finals (Match S4).

Match E

Boca Juniors won 3–0 on aggregate and advanced to the quarter-finals (Match S4).

Match F

Internacional won 3–0 on aggregate and advanced to the quarter-finals (Match S3).

Match G

Grêmio won 5–0 on aggregate and advanced to the quarter-finals (Match S2).

Match H

Cerro Porteño won 2–1 on aggregate and advanced to the quarter-finals (Match S1).

Quarter-finals
The first legs were played on 20–22 August, and the second legs were played on 27–29 August 2019.

|}

Match S1

River Plate won 3–1 on aggregate and advanced to the semi-finals (Match F1).

Match S2

Tied 2–2 on aggregate, Grêmio won on away goals and advanced to the semi-finals (Match F2).

Match S3

Flamengo won 3–1 on aggregate and advanced to the semi-finals (Match F2).

Match S4

Boca Juniors won 3–0 on aggregate and advanced to the semi-finals (Match F1).

Semi-finals
The first legs were played on 1–2 October, and the second legs were played on 22–23 October 2019.

|}

Match F1

River Plate won 2–1 on aggregate and advanced to the final.

Match F2

Flamengo won 6–1 on aggregate and advanced to the final.

Final

The final was played on 23 November 2019 at the Estadio Monumental in Lima.

Notes

References

External links
CONMEBOL Libertadores 2019, CONMEBOL.com

3
July 2019 sports events in South America
August 2019 sports events in South America
October 2019 sports events in South America
November 2019 sports events in South America